Le Tarent is a mountain in the western Bernese Alps, overlooking Les Diablerets in the canton of Vaud. At 2,548 metres above sea level, it is the highest mountain of the range lying north of the Col du Pillon. The mountain, which lies near the border with the canton of Bern, is composed of several subsidiary summits, the highest being the Châtillon (2,478 m) and La Para (2,540 m).

References

External links
Le Tarent on Hikr

Mountains of the Alps
Mountains of Switzerland
Mountains of the canton of Vaud
Bernese Alps